Philocryptica is a monotypic genus of moths belonging to the subfamily Tortricinae of the family Tortricidae. It contains only one species, Philocryptica polypodii, the leather-leaf star-miner, which is endemic to New Zealand. This species has been recorded in both the North Island and the South Island, as far south as Banks Peninsula. The preferred habitat of this species is native forest where the species' larval host is present. The larvae feed on Pyrrosia eleagnifolia, mining the host plant leaves. P. polypodii pupates within the final blotch-mine. Adults are on the wing in November and December.

Taxonomy 
The genus was first described by Edward Meyrick in 1923. The species was first described by Morris Watt in 1921 using a darkly marked species in the Wellington Botanic Gardens and named Harmologa polypodii. In 1923 Meyrick placed this species in the newly described genus Philocryptica. In 1924 Watt described the life history of this species in detail. George Hudson discussed and illustrated this species in his 1928 book The butterflies and moths of New Zealand. The male lectotype collected in Wellington is held at the Te Papa.

Description 

The genus was described by Edward Meyrick as follows: 

The larvae of P. polypodii were described by Watts as follows:

Hudson described the pupa of the species as follows:

Hudson described the adults of the species as follows:
P. polypodii is the only species that creates the star-like pattern on the leaves of its host. This adults of this species is similar in appearance to Tortrix fervida and Tortrix sphenias. However P. polypodii can be distinguished as it has a reddish coloured thorax and leaden coloured  forewing scales. The colouration of adult moths ensure the species is well camouflaged when resting against the dead or dying leaves of its host plant.

Distribution 
This species is endemic to New Zealand. It has been recorded in both the North Island and the South Island, as far south as Banks Peninsula.

Habitat 
P. polypodii inhabits native forest where the larval host of the moth, Pyrrosia eleagnifolia, is present.

Life history and larval host plant 

It is assumed that the eggs of this species are laid on the host plant. The larvae feed over winter and spring on P. eleagnifolia, mining the leaves. Young larvae create a number of mines radiating from the base creating a star shape. These mines are filled with frass. After the leaf withers, the larva moves on to another leaf. As the larva grows, the size of the mine also increases. At the final stage of larval development, the older larvae create a large blotch mine in which it pupates.  Larvae have been collected in August and September. These larvae pupated in October and emerged as adult moths from the 20th of October until the 1st of December.

Behaviour 
The larva will produced black coloured liquid from its mouth if disturbed. The larva will exude a silken thread if shaken from the leaf which they then use to return to their host. When the adult moth is disturbed it runs about in an unpredictable directions adding pauses in its activity. The adult moth is on the wing from November to December. When in flight this moth moves erratically and rapidly.

Natural enemies 
It is assumed that insects, spiders and birds feed on the adult moths of this species. Larvae of a species of wasp in the genus Dolichogenidea have been discovered in mines of P. eleagnifolia. The wasp larva inhabits the mine, spinning a silk cocoon and pupating within it . Once developed the adult wasp exits the mine by eating through it.

Conservation status 
This species is wide spread and is not regarded as threatened.

References

Archipini
Leaf miners
Monotypic moth genera
Moths described in 1921
Moths of New Zealand
Tortricidae genera